Cnemaspis kumarasinghei, commonly known as Kumarasinghe's day gecko, is a species of diurnal gecko in the family Gekkonidae. The species is endemic to the island of Sri Lanka.

Etymology
The specific name, kumarasinghei, is in honor of Sri Lankan wildlife ranger Siril Kumarasinghe, who was killed in the line of duty in 2007.

Reproduction
C. kumarasinghei is oviparous.

References

Further reading
Wickramasinghe, L. J. M., Munindradasa, D. A. I. (2007). "Review of the genus Cnemaspis Strauch, 1887 (Sauria: Gekkonidae) in Sri Lanka with the description of five new species". Zootaxa 1490: 1-63. (Cnemaspis kumarasinghei, new species, pp. 7-8).

kumarasinghei
Reptiles of Sri Lanka
Reptiles described in 2007